The  Washington Redskins season was the franchise's 53rd season in the National Football League.  They failed to improve on their 14–2 record from 1983 and finished at 11-5. Art Monk set an NFL record (since broken) for most receptions in a season. The Redskins started the season losing their first two games but would recover to win their next five games. A mid-season slump had them on the playoff bubble at 7-5. However, the Redskins would finish the season in strong fashion winning their final four games to win the NFC East with an 11-5 record. The Redskins quest for a third straight NFC Championship ended quickly as the Skins were stunned by the Chicago Bears 23-19 at RFK Stadium, Washington's only playoff loss at RFK. The 1984 Redskins have an NFL-record 14 straight games with 3 or more sacks, having accomplished that from weeks 3 to 16.

Offseason

NFL draft

Roster

Regular season

Schedule

Note: Intra-division opponents are in bold text.

Week 1 (Sunday, September 2, 1984): vs. Miami Dolphins 

Point spread: Redskins by 4½
 Over/Under: 46.0 (over)
 Time of Game: 2 hours, 45 minutes

Week 2 (Monday, September 10, 1984): at San Francisco 49ers 

Point spread: 49ers by 2
 Over/Under: 52.0 (over)
 Time of Game:

Week 3 (Sunday, September 16, 1984): vs. New York Giants

Week 4 (Sunday, September 23, 1984): at New England Patriots

Week 5 (Sunday, September 30, 1984): vs. Philadelphia Eagles

Week 6 (Sunday, October 7, 1984): at Indianapolis Colts

Week 7 (Sunday, October 14, 1984): vs. Dallas Cowboys 

Time of Game:

Week 8 (Sunday, October 21, 1984): at St. Louis Cardinals

Week 9 (Sunday, October 28, 1984): at New York Giants

Week 10 (Monday, November 5, 1984): vs. Atlanta Falcons 

Time of Game:

Week 11 (Sunday, November 11, 1984): vs. Detroit Lions

Week 12 (Sunday, November 18, 1984): at Philadelphia Eagles

Week 13 (Sunday, November 25, 1984): vs. Buffalo Bills

Week 14 (Thursday, November 29, 1984): at Minnesota Vikings

Week 15 (Sunday, December 9, 1984): at Dallas Cowboys 

Time of Game:

Week 16 (Sunday, December 16, 1984): vs. St. Louis Cardinals

Playoffs

NFC Divisional Playoffs (Sunday, December 30, 1984): vs. Chicago Bears

Standings

Awards and records
 Art Monk, NFL Receptions Leader (106)
 John Riggins, NFL Rushing TD Leader (14, Tied)

Milestones
 Art Monk, 1st 100 Reception Season
 John Riggins, breaks 10,000 career rushing yards
 First season sweep over the Dallas Cowboys in franchise history.
 Joe Theismann becomes Redskins all-time leader in passing attempts, passing completions and passing yards.

References

Washington
Washington Redskins seasons
NFC East championship seasons
Wash